Patrick Olivelle is an Indologist.  A philologist and scholar of Sanskrit Literature whose work has focused on asceticism, renunciation and the dharma, Olivelle has been Professor of Sanskrit and Indian Religions in the Department of Asian Studies at the University of Texas at Austin since 1991.

Olivelle was born in Sri Lanka.  He received a B.A. (Honours) in 1972 from the University of Oxford, where he studied Sanskrit, Pali and Indian religions with Thomas Burrow and R.C. Zaehner. He received his Ph.D. from the University of Pennsylvania in 1974 for a thesis containing the critical edition and translation of Yadava Prakasa's Yatidharmaprakasa under the supervision of Ludo Rocher. Between 1974 and 1991, Olivelle taught in the Department of Religious Studies at Indiana University Bloomington.

Bibliography

Notes

References

External links

Sri Lankan Indologists
Linguists from Sri Lanka
Sanskrit scholars
Sanskrit–English translators
Living people
University of Texas at Austin faculty
1942 births